Art Island (Île d'Art) is the largest of the Belep Islands archipelago in New Caledonia. Its chief settlement is Waala, which is also the capital of Belep commune.

Islands of New Caledonia